Sidney Municipal Airport  (Lloyd W. Carr Field) is three miles south of Sidney, in Cheyenne County, Nebraska. It is owned by the Sidney Airport Authority.

The first airline flights were Frontier DC-3s in 1959; the last Frontier Twin Otter left in 1980.

Facilities
It has two runways: 13/31 is 6,600 x 100 ft (2,012 x 30 m) concrete and 3/21 is 4,700 x 75 ft (1,433 x 23 m) turf.

In the year ending August 1, 2006 the airport had 11,475 aircraft operations, average 31 per day: 90% general aviation, 8% air taxi and 3% military. 32 aircraft were then based at the airport: 88% single-engine, 6% jet, 3% helicopter and 3% ultralight.

References

External links 

Airports in Nebraska
Buildings and structures in Cheyenne County, Nebraska
Former Essential Air Service airports